The 1966 Star World Championships were held in Kiel, West Germany in 1966.

Results

References

Star World Championships
1966 in sailing
Sailing competitions in West Germany